Gomalia is a genus of marbled skippers in the butterfly family Hesperiidae. There are three described species in Gomalia.

Gomalia albofasciata was formerly considered subspecies of Gomalia elma, and Gomalia jeanneli was formerly considered a synonym of Gomalia elma. They were both reinstated as full species as a result of genomic research published in 2020.

Species
These species belong to the genus Gomalia:
 Gomalia albofasciata Moore, 1879 (Asian marbled skipper)
 Gomalia elma (Trimen, 1862) (green-marbled skipper or African marbled skipper)
 Gomalia jeanneli (Picard, 1949)

References

Further reading

 

Carcharodini
Taxa named by Frederic Moore
Hesperiidae genera